The women's 10 metre platform competition at 2013 World Aquatics Championships was held on July 24 with the preliminary round and semifinal and the final on July 25.

Results
The preliminary round was held on July 24 at 10:00 and the semifinal at 14:00 with the final on July 25 at 17:30.

Green denotes finalists

Blue denotes semifinalists

References

Women's 10 m platform